The 2007 Niger State gubernatorial election was the 6th gubernatorial election of Niger State. Held on April 14, 2007, the People's Democratic Party nominee Mu'azu Babangida Aliyu won the election, defeating David Umaru of the All Nigeria Peoples Party.

Results 
A total of 12 candidates contested in the election. Mu'azu Babangida Aliyu from the People's Democratic Party won the election, defeating David Umaru from the All Nigeria Peoples Party. The number of registered voters was 1,551,903.

References 

Niger State gubernatorial elections
Niger gubernatorial